Days of the Bagnold Summer is the tenth studio album by Scottish band Belle and Sebastian. Released on 13 September 2019 through Matador Records, it serves as a soundtrack for the 2020 film of the same name directed by Simon Bird.

The first single from the album, "Sister Buddha" was released on 1 July 2019. The second single "This Letter" was released on 5 September 2019.

The album contains 11 new songs (including “Safety Valve” written by Stuart Murdoch before Belle and Sebastian formed). The two other songs are rerecordings of :
 “I Know Where the Summer Goes” (This Is Just a Modern Rock Song EP — 1998)
 “Get Me Away From Here, I’m Dying” (If You're Feeling Sinister — 1996)

Critical reception
Days of the Bagnold Summer was met with generally favourable reviews from critics. At Metacritic, which assigns a weighted average rating out of 100 to reviews from mainstream publications, this release received an average score of 68, based on 9 reviews.

Track listing

Charts

References

2019 albums
Belle and Sebastian albums
Matador Records albums